Crenicichla zebrina is a species of cichlid native to South America. It is found only from the Ventuari River, the largest Venezuelan tributary of the upper Orinoco River basin.

References

Montaña, C.G., H. López-Fernández and D.C. Taphorn, 2008. A new species of Crenicichla (Perciformes: Cichlidae) from the Ventuari River, Upper Orinoco River Basin, Amazonas State, Venezuela. Zootaxa 1856:33-40.

zebrina
Fish of Venezuela
Taxa named by Carmen G. Montaña
Taxa named by Hernán López-Fernández
Taxa named by Donald Charles Taphorn Baechle
Fish described in 2008